The Church of Jesus Christ of Latter-day Saints in Panama refers to the Church of Jesus Christ of Latter-day Saints (LDS Church) and its members in Panama. The first branch (small congregation) was formed in 1955. As of December 31, 2021, there were 60,108 members in 73 congregations in Panama.

History

A brief history can be found at LDS Newsroom (Panama) or Deseret News 2010 Church Almanac (Panama)

Stakes and Districts
As of February 2023, Panama had the following stakes and districts:

Missions
The Panamá Panamá City Mission was organized July 1, 1988 and is the only mission in Panama.

Temples

The Panama City Panama temple was announced by the LDS Church on August 23, 2002. Ground was broken by Spencer V. Jones, a General Authority Seventy of the LDS Church, on October 30, 2005, three years after its announcement. The open house for the temple was held from July 11 to July 26, 2008, with the temple being dedicated in four sessions by church president Thomas S. Monson on August 10, 2008.

See also
Religion in Panama

References

External links
LDS Newsroom - Panama
The Church of Jesus Christ of Latter-day Saints - Official Site
The Church of Jesus Christ of Latter-day Saints - Visitors Site